Adjane Audrey Koumba (born 8 April 1989 in Libreville) is a Gabonese judoka. She competed at the 2012 Summer Olympics in the -78 kg event and was eliminated in her second match by Abigél Joó of Hungary.

References

External links
 
 
 

1989 births
Living people
Gabonese female judoka
Olympic judoka of Gabon
Judoka at the 2012 Summer Olympics
Sportspeople from Libreville
African Games bronze medalists for Gabon
African Games medalists in judo
Competitors at the 2007 All-Africa Games
21st-century Gabonese people